Joel Harry Eaves (June 3, 1914 – July 18, 1991) was an American college football and basketball player, coach, and athletic director. He is perhaps most known for coaching basketball at his alma mater, the Auburn Tigers of Auburn University. He is the all-time winningest coach in Auburn basketball history. He was also once athletic director for the Georgia Bulldogs. Eaves was inducted into the Alabama Sports Hall of Fame in 1978.

Early years
Eaves was born on the Georgia state line in Copperhill, Tennessee. He grew up in Atlanta and attended Tech High School.

Playing career
Eaves played on the Auburn Tigers basketball, football, and baseball teams

Basketball
Eaves was captain of the basketball team his senior year, an all-around guard. He stood 6 feet 3 inches and weighed 190 pounds. The head coach of the basketball team was Ralph "Shug" Jordan.

Football
On coach Jack Meagher's football team, Eaves was an end, selected All-SEC by the Associated Press in 1936. He was drafted in the eighth round of the 1937 NFL Draft by the Boston Redskins but never played in the National Football League (NFL).

Baseball
He pitched on the baseball team.

Coaching career

Sewanee
Before coaching at Auburn, he coached the Sewanee Tigers basketball team.

Auburn
Eaves coached the Auburn men's basketball program from 1949 to 1963. He guided Auburn to its first SEC championship in 1960, and was named SEC Coach of the Year that season. Eaves made famous the shuffle offense while at Auburn. After 14 seasons at Auburn, Eaves finished with a record of 213–100 (.681), making him the winningest men's basketball coach in Auburn history.

Eaves also assisted with the football team while at Auburn, helping with the freshmen ends for two years before coaching varsity defensive ends, contributing to Auburn's 1957 national championship.

Joel Eaves was inducted into the Alabama Sports Hall of Fame in 1978. Auburn's Memorial Coliseum was renamed after Eaves to Joel H. Eaves Memorial Coliseum in 1987, and later to Beard–Eaves–Memorial Coliseum in 1993.

Administrative career
Eaves was the athletic director for the Georgia Bulldogs from 1963 to 1979. He hired Vince Dooley as football coach.

Head coaching record

References

1914 births
1991 deaths
American football ends
American men's basketball players
Auburn Tigers baseball players
Auburn Tigers men's basketball coaches
Auburn Tigers men's basketball players
Auburn Tigers football coaches
Auburn Tigers football players
Baseball pitchers
Basketball coaches from Georgia (U.S. state)
Basketball players from Atlanta
Georgia Bulldogs and Lady Bulldogs athletic directors
Guards (basketball)
People from Polk County, Tennessee
Players of American football from Atlanta
Sewanee Tigers men's basketball coaches